Svante Ingelsson (born 14 June 1998) is a Swedish professional footballer who plays as a midfielder for German club Hansa Rostock.

Club career

Kalmar FF
Born in Kalmar, Svante Ingelsson played in there from 2002 to 2017, starting as a four-year-old in IFK Berga, before moving to Kalmar FF ten years later in 2012. Being a key player in the Sweden U17 team and Kalmar's U17 and U19 teams, he was offered a senior contract in July 2015, a month after he turned 17. He made his Allsvenskan debut in September later that year, coming on as substitute in the 82nd minute in Kalmar's draw away against Åtvidabergs FF. Ingelsson played three more games of the 2015 season, all of them as a substitute, and signed an extension of his contract that would keep him at the club for another three years. His first goal in the Allsvenskan came on 27 May 2017 in a 3–0 home victory over GIF Sundsvall. His goal, which was the second of the match, came in the 20th minute.

Udinese Calcio
On 1 July 2017, Ingelsson joined Udinese Calcio from Kalmar FF for an undisclosed transfer fee, signing a four-year contract due to run until 29 June 2021. He made his league debut for the club on 29 October 2017 in a 2–1 home victory over Atalanta. He was subbed off in the 62nd minute, and was replaced by Emil Hallfreðsson. His first league goal for the club came on 18 April 2018 in a 4–2 away loss to Napoli. His goal, assisted by Francesco Zampano, came in the 55th minute.

Loan to Pescara
On 30 August 2019, he joined Pescara on loan.

Loan to Kalmar
On 23 January 2020, he returned to Kalmar on loan until summer 2020.

Loan to SC Paderborn
On 23 September 2020, he joined German club SC Paderborn 07 on loan for the 2020–21 season.

Hansa Rostock
In June 2021 it was announced that Ingelsson would join FC Hansa Rostock, newly promoted to the 2. Bundesliga for the 2021–22 season.

International career
Ingelsson represented the Sweden U17 team 17 times between 2013 and 2015, in which he scored two goals. In 2015, Ingelsson played his first game for the Sweden U19 team.

Career statistics

Club

References

External links
 
 
 Kalmar FF profile
 

1998 births
Living people
People from Kalmar
Association football midfielders
Swedish footballers
Sweden under-21 international footballers
Sweden youth international footballers
Allsvenskan players
Kalmar FF players
Udinese Calcio players
Delfino Pescara 1936 players
SC Paderborn 07 players
FC Hansa Rostock players
Serie A players
Serie B players
2. Bundesliga players
Swedish expatriate footballers
Swedish expatriate sportspeople in Italy
Expatriate footballers in Italy
Swedish expatriate sportspeople in Germany
Expatriate footballers in Germany
Sportspeople from Kalmar County